Cellista (born Freya Seeburger, February 21, 1983, in Colorado) is an American cellist and artistic director. She is known for collaborating with artists across various media, as well as live performances in unconventional spaces that incorporate elements of classical music, theater, improvisation and visual art across a range of genres including pop, hip-hop, classical and more. These performances often feature a carbon fiber cello and loop station.

Stage Poems  
Cellista's stage poems are multimedia installations that weave together various discipline into a presentation which encapsulates a story.

Bird in a Cage 
Created in collaboration with visual artist Tulio Flores, ‘Bird in a Cage’  placed Cellista within an ornate birdcage on a public street. She costumed to look like a surrealist doll. As people passed by on the street, Cellista played her cello through a loop station to draw them nearer. As they came closer and listened, they were asked  to fill out a paper receipt tag tied to the cage with a hope, wish or dream. Cellista performed improvised responses to those tags. Subsequent performances and projects all incorporate these tags.

The End of Time 
Her interdisciplinary exhibit The End of Time alongside internationally renowned visual artist Barron Storey's solo exhibit Quartet at Anno Domini art gallery in downtown San Jose, California with her chamber music collective the Juxtapositions Chamber Ensemble received critical acclaim. The dual exhibition, created in tribute to French composer Olivier Messiaen’s seminal chamber work The Quartet for the End of Time, received mention in Juxtapoz magazine.

Of the quartet, Cellista has said "The narrative of the quartet seemed to have immediacy to the San Jose of now. I think in many ways it makes apparent San Jose's connection to the past and illuminates a way to the future."

Finding San Jose 
Full-length album and stage poem.  Recorded between 2015 and 2016, after a successful Kickstarter campaign, the album utilized the receipt tags as creative prompts from ‘Bird in a Cage.’   Finding San Jose became the soundtrack for an hour long presentation that contained a reminiscent story about a  love affair with a city. The story was conveyed through the creation of a full-length film that played as the live stage poem, with ballet and live music. The film and stage poem, are both able to function independently. The album was featured on KQED and San Jose's Metroactive.

Transfigurations 
Transfigurations is a multidisciplinary performance art piece and album created by Cellista. Both the album and the installation are accompanied by a full-length book written by Cellista and her father, the philosopher Frank Seeburger, known for his work on Heidegger, and addiction.

Transfigurations is a response to the Trump presidency and the repetitions of history, which reinforce the unequal structures that gave rise to this moment in time. Transfigurations as a performance piece incorporates original sound design, live cello improvisations, new compositions by Bay Area composers, chamber music, and modern dance.

After its first live performance, the piece was turned into a 20-minute film that debuted on at the Diamond in the Rough Film Festival. The debut performance was also featured on KQED for its 100 Days of Art series. The album is set to be released in late May 2019 and to be followed by a national tour.

Tv and Film
 Cellista a short film by Brian Favorite. Role: Composer and Actor 
Sickness In The System by Brian Gibel, Distributed by Field of Vision. Role: Composer 
The Real Murders of Orange County on Oxygen, Season 2 Episodes: 201, 202, 203, 204, 206, 208, 210. Role: Composer

Acting
Will & Grace special event series "Back This Fall" Trailer. Role: Extra

Session work 

A noted session musician for both recording and live performance, Cellista has worked with:

 Grammy-nominated artist Tanya Donelly
 Producer John Vanderslice
 Don McLean
 Casey Crescenzo
 Van Dyke Parks.
 Yassou
 Lady Lazarus
 The Canales Project with Carla Canales and Kurt Crowley, musical director of Broadway's Hamilton
 Christine Ebersole

JAMS 
Cellista is the founding artistic director of the JAMS (Juxtapositions Avant Music Symphony). a process-based ensemble that merges classical and contemporary repertoire and provides professional development, mentoring and advocacy for emerging artists.

Awesome Orchestra 

Cellista is an Ambassador for the Awesome Orchestra, a classical music collective with an eye towards increasing the accessibility of orchestral music.

Education 

Cellista has studied with Jennifer Culp formerly of the Kronos Quartet and faculty at the San Francisco Conservatory of Music and the Alexander String Quartet.

Instruments 

Cellista plays a Luis and Clark carbon fibre cello and an 1885 Czech cello.

Discography 

Cellista's debut full-length album Finding San Jose engineered by Maryam Qudus (Doe Eye) was released in Fall 2016. Of the album, she remarked "Most especially, this is an offering to the artists of San Jose. I owe San Jose my creative life. I see the town going through a period of rapid growth and development, and I would like to offer this album to my community in dedication of a time when San Jose used to be orchards." The album was re-mixed by a number of Bay area artists including Pam the Funkstress the legendary turntablist and DJ for music icon Prince (musician).

Awards and honors

Cellista is a 2014 Belle Foundation grantee. She is also a Nagel's Scholarship recipient. For her work with Messiaen's "Quatuor Pour La Fin Du Temps", she received the Otey Award for research writing from San Francisco State University. She has also sat on several panels, including the ImagineSJ music panel. She was a San Jose Art Commissioner  between 2015 and 2016.

References

External links
 
 
 
 
 Cellista on JMS Podcast

1983 births
21st-century American musicians
American classical cellists
Women cellists
Living people
Musicians from San Jose, California
Place of birth missing (living people)
21st-century American women musicians
Classical musicians from California
21st-century cellists